Luís Dias may refer to:

 Luís Filipe Veiga Dias (born 1981), Portuguese football defender
 Luís Manuel Braga Dias (born 1987), Portuguese football defender
 Luis Días (composer) (1952–2009), Dominican Republic musician and composer
 Luís Henrique Dias (born 1960), Brazilian former footballer
 Luís Germano Borlotes Dias, footballer